is the third major single from the Japanese pop group Cute, released on October 17, 2007 on the Zetima label.

The CD single was released in two versions: Regular Edition and Limited Edition, the latter included a bonus DVD with a concert performance. It debuted at number 3 in the Oricon Weekly Singles Chart, remaining in the chart for 4 weeks.

On October 31, the Single V containing the "Tokaikko Junjō" music video appeared.

As of November 28, 2007, the single has sold 38,085 copies, making it their highest-selling single to date, and also the second-best selling Hello! Project Kids single after Buono!'s debut single "Honto no Jibun".

On December 30, 2007, for the single "Tokaikko Junjō" C-ute received the Japan Record Award for Best New Artist.

Description 
The selected lead singer for Tokaikko Junjō is Airi Suzuki. The Minor Vocals for Tokaikko Junjō are Mai Hagiwara and Saki Nakajima, they get 3 and 2 solo lines. Maimi Yajima also gets a solo line and 2 paragraphs of soliloquy. It's dance performance designated Airi Suzuki, Mai Hagiwara and Saki Nakajima as choreographical centre, but in the middle of the song, Airi Suzuki and Maimi Yajima are the center positions.

Track listing

Charts

Awards

Japan Record Awards 
The Japan Record Awards is a major music awards show held annually in Japan by the Japan Composer's Association.

|-
|rowspan=2| 2007
|rowspan=2 align="center"| Cute "Tokaikko Junjō"
| New Artist
| 
|-
| Best New Artist
| 

See also
 49th Japan Record Awards

References

External links 
 Tokaikko Junjō entry on the Up-Front Works official website

2007 singles
Japanese-language songs
Cute (Japanese idol group) songs
Songs written by Tsunku
Song recordings produced by Tsunku
Zetima Records singles
Japanese synth-pop songs
Dance-pop songs
Torch songs
2007 songs